Cameron Richard Gliddon (born 16 August 1989) is an Australian professional basketball player for the New Zealand Breakers of the National Basketball League (NBL). He played four years of college basketball for Concordia University before returning to Australia and joining the Cairns Taipans. He went on to win the NBL Rookie of the Year Award in 2012–13, and led the Taipans to the minor premiership in 2014–15. Between 2018 and 2022, he played two seasons for the Brisbane Bullets and two seasons for the South East Melbourne Phoenix.

Early life and career
Gliddon was born in Perth, Western Australia, and grew up in Bunbury. He attended Bunbury Senior High School and played for the PCYC Bulls in the Bunbury domestic competition. He also represented the Bunbury Slammers at WABL and SBL level. In 2007, he moved to Canberra and played for the Australian Institute of Sport (AIS) in the SEABL, averaging 7.1 points, 3.3 rebounds and 1.5 assists in 17 games. He returned to Bunbury in 2008 and played WABL for the Slammers, earning Men's Division 1 All Star honours. In 2009, he earned WABL Open Men All Star honours with the Slammers.

College career
For the 2008–09 season, Gliddon moved to the United States to play basketball for Concordia University. As a freshman, Gliddon finished second on the team for three-pointers made with 65. In 35 games (13 starts), he averaged 9.6 points, 2.8 rebounds, 1.7 assists and 1.3 steals per game.

As a sophomore in 2009–10, Gliddon led the GSAC for three-pointers made with 85, as he tied for sixth-most in school single-season history. In 32 games (26 starts), he averaged 10.8 points, 1.9 rebounds, 1.0 assists and 1.1 steals per game.

As a junior in 2010–11, Gliddon recorded a career-high eight made three-pointers against Concordia Chicago on 29 December 2010. In 36 games (20 starts), he averaged 9.1 points, 2.0 rebounds, 1.6 assists and 1.1 steals per game.

As a senior in 2011–12, Gliddon led the Eagles to the NAIA national championship, going on to be named the All-Tournament MVP and to the All-Tournament Team, as well as the first-team All-NAIA D1. In 38 games (all starts), he averaged 14.6 points, 3.6 rebounds, 2.3 assists and 2.0 steals per game.

Professional career

Cairns Taipans (2012–2018)

2012–13 season
On 3 May 2012, Gliddon signed a three-year deal with the Cairns Taipans of the National Basketball League. Signed as a little-known shooting guard, Gliddon developed into the Taipans' trump card during the 2012/13 season, playing all 28 games and breaking into the starting five. He averaged 7.1 points, 4.0 rebounds and 2.8 assists. Defensively, Gliddon was ranked third in the league for steals averaging 1.4 per game. He scored in double figures nine times, including scoring a career-high 26 points against the Perth Wildcats—the club he grew up supporting—late in the season. At the season's end, he was named the recipient of the NBL Rookie of the Year Award. He became the NBL's second rookie of the year from Bunbury, joining Mark Worthington (2006).

2013–14 season
A recurring back injury sidelined Gliddon for three matches during the 2013/14 season, as he had a dominant second half of the season. After assuming a more integral part of the Cairns offense, Gliddon improved his scoring output from 7.1 points per game to 12 and his efficiency also improved, shooting around 50 per cent from the field as opposed to 35.9 per cent in 2012/13. In March 2014, he was named the Cairns Taipans MVP at the club's annual awards. At 24, Gliddon became the youngest player to win the award since Nathan Jawai in 2008 at the age of 21. In 25 games, Gliddon averaged 12.1 points, 3.0 rebounds and 2.9 assists per game.

2014–15 season
On 1 April 2014, Gliddon took up the option of the third year of his three-year contract, re-signing with the Taipans for the 2014/15 season. Prior to the season, Gliddon was named team captain. In February 2015, the Taipans clinched their first ever NBL minor premiership. They finished the regular season in first place with a 21–7 record, marking the first time since the now defunct Geelong Supercats in 1984, that a regional team has topped the regular season log. They went on to reach the 2015 NBL Grand Final series, where they faced the New Zealand Breakers. Despite having home court advantage, the Taipans were defeated in Cairns by the Breakers in Game 1, losing 86–71. They went on to lose at the buzzer in Game 2 in Auckland, as the Breakers claimed the championship with an 83–81 win. Gliddon appeared in all 32 games for the Taipans in 2014/15, averaging 10.5 points, 4.5 rebounds and 2.5 assists per game.

2015–16 season
On 27 March 2015, Gliddon re-signed with the Taipans on a three-year deal; the contract included a European out-clause after the 2015/16 season. He led the Taipans in scoring with 13.5 points per game (46 per cent) in 2015/16, and was the team's best shooter from outside (38.9 per cent) and at the charity stripe (87.5 per cent). He was subsequently named the Cairns Taipans MVP at the club's annual awards, becoming the third player to be named the club MVP multiple times. The Taipans missed the finals in 2015/16 after finishing with a 12–16 record.

Following the conclusion of the Taipans' season, Gliddon joined AZS Koszalin of the Polish Basketball League. In 10 games for Koszalin, he averaged 7.2 points, 3.0 rebounds and 1.3 assists per game.

2016–17 season
Heading into the 2016/17 season, Taipans coach Aaron Fearne demanded more of Gliddon in his third season as captain. During pre-season, Gliddon claimed the Ray Borner tournament MVP Medal. The Taipans returned to the finals in 2016/17 after finishing the regular season in second place with a 15–13 record. They went on to lose to the third-seeded Perth Wildcats in the semi-finals, bowing out in straight sets. Gliddon once again appeared in every game on the season, averaging 10.6 points, 3.0 rebounds, 3.1 assists and 1.2 steals in 30 contests.

Following the conclusion of the Taipans' season, Gliddon joined Russian club Avtodor Saratov of the VTB United League. He appeared in five games for Avtodor, averaging 1.4 points and 1.6 rebounds per game.

2017–18 season
In 2017/18, Gliddon started in all 28 games and led the Taipans with an average of 12.6 points per game, scoring a total of 353 points. He led the NBL in free throws, only missing one throughout the entire season, finishing 48-from-49. Gliddon finished in the Top 13 in the NBL's MVP voting, and was named the Cairns Taipans co-MVP alongside Mitch McCarron. The Taipans missed the finals in 2017/18, finishing in sixth place with an 11–17 record.

On 28 March 2018, Gliddon parted ways with the Taipans.

Brisbane Bullets (2018–2020)
On 17 April 2018, Gliddon signed a three-year deal with the Brisbane Bullets. On 4 November 2018, he scored a career-high 30 points and hit the game-winning three-pointer with under a second left on the clock as the Bullets defeated the Adelaide 36ers 93–90. He helped the Bullets finish the regular season in fourth place with a 14–14 record, going on to lose 2–0 to the Perth Wildcats in the semi-finals despite his 18 points in game one and 10 points in game two, which was his 200th game in the NBL.

On 17 June 2020, Gliddon was released from the final year of his contract with the Bullets in mutual agreement.

Canterbury Rams (2019)
On 13 February 2019, Gliddon signed with the Canterbury Rams for the 2019 New Zealand NBL season. He was named the NBL's Most Outstanding Guard and earned All-Star Five honours. In 18 games, he averaged 14.4 points, 5.2 rebounds, 3.5 assists and 1.7 steals per game.

South East Melbourne Phoenix (2020–2022)
On 16 July 2020, Gliddon signed a two-year deal with the South East Melbourne Phoenix.

New Zealand Breakers and Auckland Tuatara (2022–present)
On 7 June 2022, Gliddon signed a two-year deal with the New Zealand Breakers. In December 2022, he played his 300th NBL game.

Gliddon is set to join the Auckland Tuatara for the 2023 New Zealand NBL season.

National team career
In 2007, Gliddon represented Australia at the FIBA Under-19 World Championship in Serbia.

Gliddon was in contention for the Australian Boomers' 2016 Rio Olympics team, going on to make his debut for the senior national team in 2017 at the FIBA Asia Cup, where he won a gold medal. In 2018, he helped the Boomers win gold at the Commonwealth Games. He contributed eight points, seven rebounds and five assists in the gold medal game. In 2019, he was a member of the Boomers' FIBA World Cup team.

Personal life
Gliddon has one brother and two sisters.

Gliddon and his partner Sarah have two children.

References

External links
NBL profile
Concordia Eagles bio

1989 births
Living people
2019 FIBA Basketball World Cup players
Australian expatriate basketball people in Poland
Australian expatriate basketball people in Russia
Australian expatriate basketball people in the United States
Australian men's basketball players
AZS Koszalin players
Basketball players at the 2018 Commonwealth Games
Basketball players from Perth, Western Australia
BC Avtodor Saratov players
Brisbane Bullets players
Cairns Taipans players
Canterbury Rams players
Commonwealth Games gold medallists for Australia
Commonwealth Games medallists in basketball
Concordia Eagles men's basketball players
New Zealand Breakers players
Shooting guards
South East Melbourne Phoenix players
Medallists at the 2018 Commonwealth Games